Kahyaz (also Romanized as Kahyāz; also known as Mahyāz, Qahyāz, and Qehyāz) is a village in Sofla Rural District, Zavareh District, Ardestan County, Isfahan Province, Iran. At the 2006 census, its population was 54, in 20 families.

References 

Populated places in Ardestan County